Comedy thrillers are a hybrid genre that draw subject matter generally from comedy and thrillers.

Criteria

They often include a darker tone, relative to other genres, of humor.

List of comedy thriller films

 The Big Fix (1978)
 Charade (1963) 
 Doctor (2021)
 Hopscotch (1980)
 In Bruges (2008)
 The King of Comedy (1983) 
 Kiss Kiss Bang Bang (2005)
 The Lady Vanishes (1938)
 The Ladykillers (1955)
 Lucky Number Slevin (2006) 
 Mr. and Mrs. Smith (2005)
 Silver Streak (1976)
 A Simple Favor (2018)
 A Thin Line Between Love and Hate (1996) 
 The Thin Man (1934)
 Welcome to Collinwood (2002)

See also
Social thriller
Postmodernist film

References

Film genres
Theatrical genres
 
 
Comedy
Thriller genres
Comedy genres
1970s in film
1980s in film
2000s in film